Berger is a surname in both German and French, although there is no etymological connection between the names in the two languages. The French surname is an occupational name for a shepherd, from Old French bergier (Late Latin berbicarius, from berbex 'ram'). The German surname derives from the word Berg, the word for "mountain" or "hill", and means "a resident on a mountain or hill", or someone from a toponym Berg, derived from the same. The pronunciation of the English name may sometimes be   following the French phonetics
  (the German is  ). Notable people with this surname include:

Politics
Charles W. Berger (born 1936), American politician
James S. Berger (1903–1984), American politician
Jan Johannis Adriaan Berger, Dutch Labour Party politician.
Józef Berger (1901–1962), Polish theologian and politician.
Karine Berger (born 1973), French politician
Laurent Berger (born 1968), French trade unionist
Luciana Berger (born 1981), British Liberal Democrat politician
Maria Berger (born 1956), Austrian politician
Óscar Berger (born 1946), former President of Guatemala
Ossian Berger (1849–1914), Swedish politician and lawyer
Philip E. Berger (born 1952), American politician
Sandy Berger (1945–2015), American attorney and politician
Thomas Berger (1933–2021), Canadian politician
Victor L. Berger (1860–1929), American politician
Samuel D. Berger (1911–1980), US Ambassador

Sport
Alfred Berger (1894–1966), Austrian pair skater
Andrea Berger (born 1970), American tennis player
Andreas Berger (born 1961), Austrian track and field sprinter
Barbara Berger (1930–2016), All-American Girls Professional Baseball League player
Chris Berger (1911–1965), Dutch sprinter
Daniel Berger (born 1993), American professional PGA Tour golfer
David Mark Berger (1944–1972), American-born Israeli weightlifter; Maccabiah champion (middleweight); one of the 11 hostages murdered in the Munich massacre
Frederick Berger (1849-?), American professional baseball umpire
Gerhard Berger (born 1959), Austrian Grand Prix racing driver
Guylaine Berger (born 1956), French swimmer
Han Berger (born 1950), Dutch football coach
Ilana Berger (born 1965), Israeli tennis player
Ike Berger (1936–2022), US Olympic weightlifter (featherweight)
Jan Berger (born 1976), Czech-Swiss football midfielder
Jay Berger (born 1966), American tennis player
Johann Berger (1845–1933), Austrian chess master, theorist, endgame study composer, author and editor
Lars Berger (born 1979), Norwegian biathlete
Mark Berger (born 1954), Canadian Olympic silver & bronze (judo heavyweight)
Maxie Berger (1917–2000), Canadian world champion junior welterweight boxer
Norma Berger (born 1932), All-American Girls Professional Baseball League player and sister of Barbara Berger
Ola Berger (born 1979), Norwegian ski mountaineer and cross-country skier
Olia Berger (born 1983), Canadian judoka
Patrik Berger (born 1973), Czech football midfielder
Ruud Berger (born 1980), Dutch football midfielder
Sam Berger (1900–1992), Canadian football team owner
Samuel Berger (1884–1925), US Olympic champion heavyweight boxer
Ségolène Berger (born 1978), professional tennis player from France.
Steve Berger (born 1973), American mixed martial artist
Tora Berger (born 1981), Norwegian biathlete and sister of Lars Berger
Wally Berger (1905–1988), Boston Braves slugger of the 1930s    
Ann-Katrin Berger (born 1990), German football goalkeeper

Music
Arthur Berger (1912–2003), American composer
Christian Wilhelm Berger (born 1964), Romanian composer and musician
Dominique II Berger (1780–1845), Flemish organist and carillonneur
Erna Berger (1900–1990), German soprano singer
Henri Berger (1844–1929), Hawaiian musician
Karl Berger (born 1935), German jazz musician
Ludwig Berger (composer) (1777–1839), German composer and piano teacher
Margaret Berger (born 1985), Norwegian singer, songwriter, and disc jockey
Michel Berger (1947–1992), French singer and songwriter
Wilhelm Berger (1861–1911), German composer
Wilhelm Georg Berger (1929–1993), Romanian composer
Wilhelm Peterson Berger (1867–1942), Swedish musician

Culture
Alex Berger, (born 1962), American producer, creator, consultant and entrepreneur in the media field
Charlotta Berger (1784–1852), Swedish poet and novelist 
Élie Berger (1850–1925), French archivist and palaeographer
Erika Berger (1939–2016), German television presenter and writer
Georgette Berger (1901–1986), Belgian wife of the painter René Magritte
Helmut Berger (born 1944), Austrian actor
Howard Berger, American make-up artist
Katya Berger (born 1966) (sometimes credited as Katia Berger or Katja Berger), British film actress.
John Berger (1926–2017), British art critic, novelist, painter, and author
Jonah Berger, American writer and professor
Karen Berger (born 1958), American comic book editor
Marco Berger (born 1977), Argentine film director and screenwriter
Maurice Berger (1956–2020) American cultural historian, curator, and critic
Nicole Berger (born Nicole Gouspeyre, 1934–1967), French actress
Nicole Berger (American actress) (born 2003), American actress, model, and pianist
Oscar Berger (cartoonist) (1901–1997), Slovak cartoonist
Pablo Berger (born 1963), Spanish film director
Petra Berger, born Petra Pierrette Burger, 1965), Dutch classical crossover singer, composer, photographer, and musical actress
Robert Berger (producer) (born 1934), American film producer
Senta Berger (born 1941), Austrian actress
Thomas Berger (novelist) (1924–2014), American novelist
Yves Berger (1931–2004), French writer and editor
Wiesław Adam Berger (1926–1998), Polish writer
William Berger (actor), also known as Bill Berger and Wilhelm Berger, born Wilhelm Thomas Berger (1928–1993), Austrian-American actor

Academics
Alwin Berger (1871–1931), German botanist
André Berger (born 1942), Belgian climatologist
Beverly Berger, American physicist
Hans Berger (1873–1941), German neuroscientist
Harriet Berger (died 2012), American political scientist
James Berger (statistician) (born 1950), American statistician
Jeffrey W. Berger (1963–2001), American physician and engineer
Jerry Berger (1933–2021), American journalist
Johann Gottfried von Berger (1659–1736), German physician
Josef Berger (scientist) (born 1949), Czech biomedical engineer and haematologist
Lee R. Berger (born 1965), American-born South African explorer and paleoanthropologist
Leszek Berger (1925–2012), Polish herpetologist and malacologist
Marcel Berger (1927–2016), French mathematician
Peter B. Berger (born 1956), American cardiologist
Peter L. Berger (1929–2017), Austrian-born American sociologist and theologian
Richard Berger (1894–1984), Swiss professor of design, decoration, and art history
Robert Berger (mathematician) (born 1938), American mathematician
Wolfgang H. Berger (1937–2017), German-American oceanographer

Other professions
Carolyn Berger, American State (Delaware) Supreme Court justice
Daniel Berger (engraver) (1744–1825), German engraver
David Berger (theologian) (born 1968), German theologian
Gaston Berger (1896–1960), French futurist, industrialist, philosopher and state manager
Georges Berger (1918–1967), Belgian Grand Prix racing driver
Gottlob Berger (1896–1975), German Schutzstaffel (SS) general
Irene Berger (born 1954), United States District Judge
Josef Berger (speechwriter) (1903–1981), American journalist, accused of being a Soviet spy
Patricia Wilson Berger (1926–2011), American librarian
Roland Berger (born 1937), German entrepreneur, philanthropist, and founder of Roland Berger Strategy Consultants
Roza Berger (1889–1945), 1945 Kraków pogrom victim
Theo Berger (1941–2003), German criminal

Fictional
 Erika Berger (1957?) Millennium trilogy by Stieg Larsson. Editor and co-owner of Millennium, Mikael Blomqvist's lover

See also
Birger
Bürger
Burger (disambiguation)
Burger (surname)
Burgers (surname)
Burgher (disambiguation)

German-language surnames
French-language surnames
Germanic-language surnames
Jewish surnames
Occupational surnames
German toponymic surnames